Stanislav Sorokin may refer to:

Stanislav Sorokin (boxer) (1941–1991), Russian boxer
Stanislav Sorokin (footballer) (born 2000),  Ukrainian football player